Edward Lawrence Keyes (August 28, 1843 – January 24, 1924) was a leading American urologist of the late 19th century and the first president of the American Association of Genitourinary Surgeons at its founding in 1888.

Life
Keyes, a son of General Erasmus D. Keyes, was born August 28, 1843 at Fort Moultrie Army Base in Charleston, South Carolina. He studied at Yale, 1859–1863, graduating with a master's degree, and briefly served as his father's aide-de-camp. After graduating from Medical College of the City University of New York, he entered into practice with one of his teachers, William Holme Van Buren. In 1870 he himself began lecturing on dermatology and genitourinary surgery at Bellevue Hospital Medical College.

Family
Keyes married Sarah Loughborough on April 26, 1870. From 1881 to 1907 they lived at 930 Fifth Avenue, which they had decorated by John F. Douthitt and where Sarah hosted a salon.

Their son, Edward Loughborough Keyes, was like his father a noted urologist.

Edward Lawrence Keyes died from pneumonia at his home in New York on January 24, 1924. He was buried at Gate of Heaven Cemetery.

Publications
with William H. Van Buren, Surgical Diseases of the Genito-Urinary Organs Including Syphilis (1874)
The Venereal Diseases Including Stricture of the Male Urethra (1880)
with Charles H. Chetwood, Venereal Diseases: Their Complications and Sequelae (1900)

References

1843 births
1924 deaths
American urologists
Burials at Gate of Heaven Cemetery (Hawthorne, New York)
City University of New York alumni
People from Sullivan's Island, South Carolina
Yale University alumni